Time in Palau is given by Palau Time (PWT; UTC+09:00). Palau does not have an associated daylight saving time.

IANA time zone database 
The IANA time zone database gives Palau one time zone, Pacific/Palau.

References

Time in Palau